Trebol Clan Es Trebol Clan is the second studio album by Trebol Clan. It was released on August 31, 2010. This was the first album made without Berto El Original. And the first one with only one singer

Track listing

 Intro (Feat. Wibal & Alex, J Alvarez, Tony Lenta, Mac. Dize, Gaona, Jomar & Jessikita)
 Santero
 Lo Tuyo y Lo Mío
 Agárrala II
 Ando Guerreando (Remix) (Feat. Gaona & Arcángel)
 Pa Los Moteles (Feat. J Álvarez)
 La Noche Está Buena
 Llora
 Yo Quiero Tenerte (Feat. Ñengo Flow)
 Tú La Tocaste (Feat. Mac. Dize)
 Si La Ves
 Sin Ropa (Remix) (Feat. Dyland & Lenny, MJ & Punto Cero)
 Open Bar (Feat. Farruko)
 Amor De Escuela (Feat. Tony Lenta)
 El Viaje (Feat. Wibal & Alex)
 Sálvame
 Esto Es Un Perreo (Feat. Sosa & Ñengo Flow)
 ¡Qué Mal Te Va! (Feat. Galante)
 Rampanpan
 Ando Guerreando (Feat. Gaona)
 Que La Noche Decida (Mac. Dize)
 Mami (Master Joe Feat. Dr. Joe)
 Libera El Estrés (Mac. Dize Feat. Ñengo Flow)
 Estamos De Cacería (Feat. Mac. Dize)
 La Noche Está Buena (Club Version)
 Hoy Me Voy a To'as (Feat. Jay Pee & Mac. Dize)

Trébol Clan albums
2010 albums